The Hawthorne Theatre, formerly known as the Sunnyside Masonic Lodge, is an historic building and music venue located at the intersection of Southeast Hawthorne Boulevard and Cesar Chavez Boulevard, in Portland, Oregon's Richmond neighborhood, in the United States. The building was completed in 1919, and formerly housed the restaurant Lucky Strike, as well as Conan's, a bar and music venue. It sold for approximately $2 million in 2005 and $3 million in 2013.

See also
 Mark Building, another former Masonic building in Portland

References

External links
 

1919 establishments in Oregon
Former Masonic buildings in Oregon
Music venues in Portland, Oregon
Richmond, Portland, Oregon
Theatres completed in 1919
Theatres in Portland, Oregon